Kataliontas is a small village in the Nicosia District of Cyprus, 2 km south of Analiontas. 

Communities in Nicosia District